is the second and final studio album by Japanese singer Rina Chinen, released on July 4, 2001 by Sony Music Entertainment Japan. The album includes the single "Club Zipangu", which is based on Ricky Martin's "She Bangs". With her album and single sales in a steep decline, Chinen retired from the pop music scene to focus on her career as a musical actress.

The album peaked at No. 28 on Oricon's albums chart.

Track listing 
All music is composed and arranged by Ryuichirou Yamaki, except where indicated.

Charts

References

External links 
 
 

2001 albums
Japanese-language albums
Sony Music Entertainment Japan albums